Eremaea blackwelliana is a plant in the myrtle family, Myrtaceae and is endemic to the south-west of Western Australia. It is a shrub with soft, pointed, non-prickly leaves, orange flowers in spring and cup shaped to almost spherical woody fruits. Flowers appear singly on the ends of short side branches formed in the previous year.

Description

The flowers are orange-coloured and occur singly on the end of branches formed the previous year. The outer surface of the flower cup (the hypanthium) is densely hairy. The stamens, which give the flower its colour, are arranged in 5 bundles, each containing 20 to 26 stamens. Flowering occurs from October to November and is followed by fruits which are woody capsules.

Taxonomy and naming
Eremaea blackwelliana was first formally described in 1993 by Roger Hnatiuk in Nuytsia. The specific epithet (blackwelliana) honours Marion Blackwell, a landscape designer who encouraged the cultivation of Australian native plants.

Distribution and habitat
Eremaea blackwelliana is found in the Avon district in the Avon Wheatbelt and Jarrah Forest biogeographic regions. It grows in sand in gently sloping depressions.

Conservation
Eremaea blackwelliana is listed as "Priority 4" by the Western Australian Government Department of Parks and Wildlife meaning that it is rare or near threatened.

References

blackwelliana
Myrtales of Australia
Plants described in 1993
Endemic flora of Western Australia